José Pantaleón Domínguez Román (27 July 1821, in Comitán – 8 February 1894, in Comitán) was a Mexican politician.  He participated in the Battle of Puebla during the Second French Intervention and served as Governor of the State of 1865 to 1875 .

External links 
 https://web.archive.org/web/20070329021050/http://www.e-local.gob.mx/work/templates/enciclo/chiapas/hist.htm
José Pantaleón Domínguez at Comitán website

1821 births
1894 deaths
Mexican military personnel
Governors of Chiapas
People from Comitán
19th-century Mexican politicians
Politicians from Chiapas